William McDonald (Don) Wheeler (July 11, 1915 – May 5, 1989) was a U.S. Representative from Georgia.

Life
Born near Alma, Georgia, Wheeler attended the public schools and South Georgia College at Douglas, Georgia, Middle Georgia College at Cochran, Georgia, Georgia Teachers College at Statesboro, Georgia, and Atlanta Law School, where he received a Bachelor of Laws in 1966. He was a farmer and a teacher. He was in the United States Army Air Forces from 1942 to 1946, entering as a private and working his way to captain. He served as delegate, 1952 Democratic National Convention.

Wheeler was elected as a Democrat to the Eightieth and to the three succeeding Congresses (January 3, 1947 – January 3, 1955).
He was an unsuccessful candidate for renomination in 1954.
Georgia Motor Vehicle Division in the Internal Revenue Department, Atlanta, Georgia from 1955 to 1956.
He engaged in sales and public relations. He was a tax examiner, State of Georgia.
Coordinator, Federal programs, Bacon County, Georgia, Board of Education.
He served as assistant director, Governor's Highway Safety Program, State of Mississippi.
He died on May 5, 1989, in Alma, Georgia.

References

1915 births
1989 deaths
20th-century American politicians
Atlanta Law School alumni
Democratic Party members of the United States House of Representatives from Georgia (U.S. state)
People from Bacon County, Georgia
South Georgia State College alumni
United States Army Air Forces officers
Georgia Teachers College alumni
Middle Georgia College alumni